Nadur Tower is a small watchtower in Binġemma Gap, limits of Rabat, Malta. It was completed in 1637 as the third of the Lascaris towers. Today, the tower is in good condition.

History
Nadur Tower was built in 1637 at Binġemma Gap, close to where the British later built the Victoria Lines. Unlike the other Lascaris towers, it is located inland, far away from the coast. This is because it was built to serve as a 'relay' station between the newly constructed Lippija and Għajn Tuffieħa Towers and the walled city of Mdina. The tower has views of the western part of the island of Malta.

The tower is smaller than the other Lascaris towers, having one floor instead of two. It has a square base with two rooms. Access to the roof was by a wooden ladder, which has been replaced by iron rungs stapled to the wall.

Present Day
Today, Nadur Tower is in good condition. In September 2008, it was damaged when vandals threw burnt oil on one of its sides, but it was restored after a couple of days.

References

External links

National Inventory of the Cultural Property of the Maltese Islands

Lascaris towers
Towers completed in 1637
Rabat, Malta
National Inventory of the Cultural Property of the Maltese Islands
1637 establishments in Malta